The 75th British Academy Film Awards, also known as the BAFTAs, were held on 13 March 2022 at the Royal Albert Hall in London, honouring the best national and foreign films of 2021. Presented by the British Academy of Film and Television Arts, accolades were handed out for the best feature-length film and documentaries of any nationality that were screened at British cinemas in 2021.

The nominations were announced on 3 February 2022. The EE Rising Star Award nominees, which is the only category voted for by the British public, were announced on 1 February 2022; the nomination and eventual win of Lashana Lynch confused commentators, who did not consider her "rising".

The epic science fiction film Dune received the most nominations with eleven; The Power of the Dog and Belfast followed with eight and six, respectively. The former ultimately won two—Best Film and Best Director (Jane Campion); Dune received the most wins, with five, but did not take home any major category awards.

The ceremony was hosted by actress and comedian Rebel Wilson. Many winners were not present to collect their awards, though the ceremony was exclusively in-person. This allowed the speeches of winners who were present to go on at length. While many awards were won by frontrunners in the Oscars race, a surprise win came in the Best Actress category – already populated by no Oscar nominees – for Welsh actress Joanna Scanlan for her performance in After Love.

Winners and nominees

The nominees were announced on 3 February 2022. The winners were announced on 13 March 2022.

This year, BAFTA did not hand out two of its honorary awards—BAFTA Fellowship and BAFTA Outstanding British Contribution to Cinema Award—as it plans to implement new vetting processes following the previous year's controversy surrounding Noel Clarke.

Awards
Winners are listed first and highlighted in boldface.

{| class="wikitable"
|-
| valign="top" width="50%"| 
The Power of the Dog – Jane Campion, Iain Canning, Roger Frappier, Tanya Seghatchian and Emile Sherman Belfast – Laura Berwick, Kenneth Branagh, Becca Kovacik and Tamar Thomas
 Don't Look Up – Adam McKay and Kevin Messick
 Dune – Cale Boyter, Mary Parent and Denis Villeneuve
 Licorice Pizza – Paul Thomas Anderson, Sara Murphy and Adam Somner
| valign="top" width="50%"| Jane Campion – The Power of the Dog
 Paul Thomas Anderson – Licorice Pizza Audrey Diwan – Happening Julia Ducournau – Titane Ryusuke Hamaguchi – Drive My Car Aleem Khan – After Love|-
| valign="top" width="50%"| 
Will Smith – King Richard as Richard Williams
 Adeel Akhtar – Ali & Ava as Ali
 Mahershala Ali – Swan Song as Cameron Turner
 Benedict Cumberbatch – The Power of the Dog as Phil Burbank
 Leonardo DiCaprio – Don't Look Up as Dr. Randall Mindy
 Stephen Graham – Boiling Point as Andy Jones
| valign="top" width="50%"| 
Joanna Scanlan – After Love as Mary Hussain
 Lady Gaga – House of Gucci as Patrizia Reggiani
 Alana Haim – Licorice Pizza as Alana Kane
 Emilia Jones – CODA as Ruby Rossi
 Renate Reinsve – The Worst Person in the World as Julie
 Tessa Thompson – Passing as Irene Redfield
|-
| valign="top" width="50%"| 
Troy Kotsur – CODA as Frank Rossi
 Mike Faist – West Side Story as Riff
 Ciarán Hinds – Belfast as Pop
 Woody Norman – C'mon C'mon as Jesse
 Jesse Plemons – The Power of the Dog as George Burbank
 Kodi Smit-McPhee – The Power of the Dog as Peter Gordon
| valign="top" width="50%"| 
Ariana DeBose – West Side Story as Anita
 Caitríona Balfe – Belfast as Ma
 Jessie Buckley – The Lost Daughter as Young Leda Caruso
 Ann Dowd – Mass as Linda
 Aunjanue Ellis – King Richard as Oracene "Brandy" Price
 Ruth Negga – Passing as Clare Bellew
|-
| valign="top" width="50%"| 'Licorice Pizza – Paul Thomas Anderson Being the Ricardos – Aaron Sorkin
 Belfast – Kenneth Branagh
 Don't Look Up – Adam McKay
 King Richard – Zach Baylin
| valign="top" width="50%"| CODA – Sian Heder Drive My Car – Ryusuke Hamaguchi and Takamasa Oe
 Dune – Eric Roth, Jon Spaihts and Denis Villeneuve
 The Lost Daughter – Maggie Gyllenhaal
 The Power of the Dog – Jane Campion
|-
| valign="top" width="50%"| Encanto – Jared Bush, Byron Howard, Yvett Merino and Clark Spencer Luca – Enrico Casarosa and Andrea Warren
 Flee – Jonas Poher Rasmussen and Monica Hellström
 The Mitchells vs. the Machines – Mike Rianda, Phil Lord and Christopher Miller
| valign="top" width="50%"| Summer of Soul (...Or, When the Revolution Could Not Be Televised) – Ahmir "Questlove" Thompson, David Dinerstein, Robert Fyvolent and Joseph Patel Becoming Cousteau – Liz Garbus and Dan Cogan
 Cow – Andrea Arnold and Kat Mansoor
 Flee – Jonas Poher Rasmussen and Monica Hellström
 The Rescue – Elizabeth Chai Vasarhelyi, Jimmy Chin, John Battsek and P. J. van Sandwijk
|-
| valign="top" width="50%"| Drive My Car – Ryusuke Hamaguchi and Teruhisa Yamamoto The Hand of God – Paolo Sorrentino and Lorenzo Mieli
 Parallel Mothers – Pedro Almodóvar and Agustín Almodóvar
 Petite Maman – Céline Sciamma and Bénédicte Couvreur
 The Worst Person in the World – Joachim Trier and Thomas Robsahm
| valign="top" width="50%"| West Side Story – Cindy Tolan Boiling Point – Carolyn McLeod
 Dune – Francine Maisler
 The Hand of God – Massimo Appolloni and Annamaria Sambucco
 King Richard – Rich Delia and Avy Kaufman
|-
| valign="top" width="50%"| Dune – Greig Fraser Nightmare Alley – Dan Laustsen
 No Time to Die – Linus Sandgren
 The Power of the Dog – Ari Wegner
 The Tragedy of Macbeth – Bruno Delbonnel
| valign="top" width="50%"| Cruella – Jenny Beavan Cyrano – Massimo Cantini Parrini
 Dune – Robert Morgan and Jacqueline West
 The French Dispatch – Milena Canonero
 Nightmare Alley – Luis Sequeira
|-
| valign="top" width="50%"| No Time to Die – Tom Cross and Elliot Graham Belfast – Úna Ní Dhonghaíle
 Dune – Joe Walker
 Licorice Pizza – Andy Jurgensen
 Summer of Soul (...Or, When the Revolution Could Not Be Televised) – Joshua L. Pearson
| valign="top" width="50%"| The Eyes of Tammy Faye – Linda Dowds, Stephanie Ingram and Justin Raleigh Cruella – Naomi Donne and Nadia Stacey
 Cyrano – Alessandro Bertolazzi and Siân Miller
 Dune – Love Larson and Donald Mowat
 House of Gucci – Frederic Aspiras, Jana Carboni, Giuliano Mariano and Sarah Nicole Tanno
|-
| valign="top" width="50%"| Dune – Hans Zimmer Being the Ricardos – Daniel Pemberton
 Don't Look Up – Nicholas Britell
 The French Dispatch – Alexandre Desplat
 The Power of the Dog – Jonny Greenwood
| valign="top" width="50%"| Dune – Patrice Vermette and Zsuzsanna Sipos Cyrano – Sarah Greenwood and Katie Spencer
 The French Dispatch – Adam Stockhausen and Rena DeAngelo
 Nightmare Alley – Tamara Deverell and Shane Vieau
 West Side Story – Adam Stockhausen and Rena DeAngelo
|-
| valign="top" width="50%"| Dune – Ron Bartlett, Theo Green, Doug Hemphill, Mark Mangini and Mac Ruth Last Night in Soho – Tim Cavagin, Dan Morgan, Colin Nicolson and Julian Slater
 No Time to Die – James Harrison, Simon Hayes, Paul Massey, Oliver Tarney and Mark Taylor
 A Quiet Place Part II – Erik Aadahl, Michael Barosky, Brandon Proctor and Ethan Van der Ryn
 West Side Story – Brian Chumney, Tod A. Maitland, Andy Nelson and Gary Rydstrom
| valign="top" width="50%"| Dune – Brian Connor, Paul Lambert, Tristan Myles and Gerd Nefzer Free Guy – Swen Gillberg, Bryan Grill, Nikos Kalaitzidis and Dan Sudick
 Ghostbusters: Afterlife – Aharon Bourland, Sheena Duggal, Pier Lefebvre and Alessandro Ongaro
 The Matrix Resurrections – Tom Debenham, Huw J. Evans, Dan Glass and J. D. Schwalm
 No Time to Die – Mark Bakowski, Chris Corbould, Joel Green and Charlie Noble
|-
| valign="top" width="50%"| Belfast – Kenneth Branagh, Laura Berwick, Becca Kovacik and Tamar Thomas After Love – Aleem Khan and Matthieu de Braconier
 Ali & Ava – Clio Barnard and Tracy O'Riordan
 Boiling Point – Philip Barantini, Bart Ruspoli, Hester Ruoff and James Cummings
 Cyrano – Joe Wright, Tim Bevan, Eric Fellner, Guy Heeley and Erica Schmidt
 Everybody's Talking About Jamie – Jonathan Butterell, Peter Carlton, Mark Herbert and Tom MacRae
 House of Gucci – Ridley Scott, Mark Huffam, Giannina Scott, Kevin J. Walsh, Roberto Bentivegna and Becky Johnston
 Last Night in Soho – Edgar Wright, Tim Bevan, Eric Fellner, Nira Park and Krysty Wilson-Cairns
 No Time to Die – Cary Joji Fukunaga, Barbara Broccoli, Michael G. Wilson, Neal Purvis, Robert Wade and Phoebe Waller-Bridge
 Passing – Rebecca Hall, Margot Hand, Nina Yang Bongiovi and Forest Whitaker
| valign="top" width="50%"| The Harder They Fall – Jeymes Samuel (Writer/Director) [also written by Boaz Yakin] After Love – Aleem Khan (Writer/Director)
 Boiling Point – James Cummings (Writer) and Hester Ruoff (Producer) [also written by Philip Barantini and produced by Bart Ruspoli]
 Keyboard Fantasies – Posy Dixon (Writer/Director) and Liv Proctor (Producer)
 Passing – Rebecca Hall (Writer/Director)
|-
| valign="top" width="50%"| Do Not Feed the Pigeons – Vladimir Krasilnikov, Jordi Morera and Antonin Niclass Affairs of the Art – Les Mills and Joanna Quinn
 Night of the Living Dread – Danielle Goff, Hannah Kelso, Ida Melum and Laura Jayne Tunbridge
| valign="top" width="50%"| The Black Cop – Cherish Oteka Femme – Sam H. Freeman, Ng Choon Ping, Sam Ritzenberg and Hayley Williams
 The Palace – Jo Prichard
 Stuffed – Joss Holden-Rea and Theo Rhys
 Three Meetings of the Extraordinary Committee – Max Barron, Daniel Wheldon and Michael Woodward
|-
| colspan="2" valign="top" width="50%"| Lashana Lynch' Ariana DeBose
 Harris Dickinson
 Millicent Simmonds
 Kodi Smit-McPhee
|}

Ceremony information

The ceremony was broadcast on BBC One, BBC One HD and BBC iPlayer at 7:00 p.m on 13 March 2022, the day of the ceremony, and was available to stream exclusively on BritBox in North America and South Africa simultaneously with the UK broadcast. The broadcast was not live with the awards presentation, and some parts were edited out, including host Rebel Wilson ranting about a film production gone awry and cursing the production company. Wilson was selected as host after having presented an award at the previous in-person BAFA ceremony in February 2020; in his live coverage of the 2022 ceremony for The Guardian, British film journalist Stuart Heritage wrote that Wilson had been the only funny part of the 2020 ceremony.

While Heritage enjoyed many parts of Wilson's opening monologue at the 2022 ceremony, including jokes about the demise of the BAF(T)As and her own weight loss, he was unimpressed with her wordplay regarding Tom Hiddleston's "low key" (Loki) appearance at the ceremony; Heritage went on to note throughout the broadcast that Wilson's various skits (including drawing nipples on a flip chart, inviting Andy Serkis to defile a cake shaped like Benedict Cumberbatch, and throwing her bras into the audience) were bad. NME wrote that, while the hosting was troubled, Wilson improved towards the end of the ceremony, particularly her one-liners. Digital Spy, by collecting popular tweets about the ceremony, reported that many viewers were off-put by Wilson's unfunny hosting, though some enjoyed the fact she did not hold back when it came to topical humour. The BBC (which broadcast the ceremony) agreed that Wilson's monologue and one-liners were her strongest points, writing that some of her other jokes fell flat, but they thought "on the whole [she] did a fine job". The Telegraph was instead highly negative of Wilson's hosting and the mismatched tone of the ceremony she created, but praised her ability to "plough on" anyway; it also noted that in coming on after a strong opening song, Wilson was already at a disadvantage.

The de facto theme of the ceremony was "all things Bond". Opening the ceremony, to mark the 60th anniversary of the James Bond franchise, Dame Shirley Bassey, who is connected with the franchise after contributing to the soundtrack of multiple Bond films throughout her career, performed a rendition of the title song from Diamonds Are Forever (1971), the seventh installment of the franchise, with NME praising that her voice was as good as ever, writing: "At 85, her voice remains fully capable of filling the Royal Albert Hall to the rafters". Before the ceremony, it was announced that Bassey would perform an iconic Bond theme, only to be revealed on the night. Also performing live during the ceremony was English actress and singer Emilia Jones, nominated for Best Actress in a Leading Role for her performance in CODA. She performed a rendition of Joni Mitchell's "Both Sides, Now", which her character sings in the film; she was joined by two translators signing the song in American Sign Language (ASL) and British Sign Language (BSL).

Jones' performance was introduced by Wilson, who, while welcoming the interpreters, joked that the sign for "Vladimir Putin" was instead universal, holding up a middle finger to the camera. The same gesture had been made in a different context a week earlier at the 37th Independent Spirit Awards by its hosts, Megan Mullally and Nick Offerman, and presenter Kristen Stewart. Deaf journalist Liam O'Dell wrote that Wilson's version was offensive to sign language users as it reduced their language and accessibility to a punchline. Other political humour included Wilson saying she cut a planned musical number about Prince Andrew called "Pizza Express" and a lengthy but earnest joke Serkis made about the policies of Home Secretary Priti Patel while introducing the award for Best Director. Serious statements regarding the War in Ukraine were also made by Wilson, following the In Memoriam montage, and by BAFTA Chair Krishnendu Majumdar in his opening speech, condemning the Russian invasion and reading a message from the Ukrainian Film Academy. For the second year in a row, Prince William, Duke of Cambridge, BAFTA President, did not attend the ceremony, instead delivering a speech via a pre-recorded video that aired during the ceremony.

The acceptance speeches during the ceremony were noted for their excessive length; Heritage found some of them overlong but several of them, instead, moving. He also noted that the speeches could afford to run long because the lack of winners present at the ceremony naturally cut down on speech time; Heritage was more critical towards the nominees for not attending, saying that "they [BAFTA] could have held this ceremony in a minivan for all the people who turned up to collect their awards" and, before the In Memoriam montage, that people featured in it "actually have a good excuse" for not being there. While hosting, Wilson made a poorly-received joke about the personal life of Best Actor in a Leading Role winner Will Smith and, at the response, commented that it was deserved as Smith had not shown up to the ceremony. The high number of absent nominees may be attributed to the ceremony taking place on the same day as the 27th Critics' Choice Awards, which rescheduled their ceremony shortly beforehand and stated that there were no other possible dates, acknowledging the clash and setting up a parallel venue in London (in addition to usual city Los Angeles) to encourage people to attend both ceremonies.

In a series of long speeches, Lady Gaga introduced last year's EE Rising Star Award winner, Bukky Bakray, so that Bakray could present the award; Lashana Lynch ultimately won. Heritage was also critical of this, explaining his outlook by noting that Lynch had "already risen quite high", playing main characters in major movies, including Captain Marvel (2019) (plus other Marvel Cinematic Universe entries) and the Bond film No Time to Die (2021), and so her career did not need the profile boost of the EE Rising Star Award. NME was more positive, writing that the award "underlines her rise". Lynch's acceptance speech referred to her family migrating as part of the Windrush generation and how they taught her "about failure, about noes and what noes mean and how to celebrate your yeses", preparing her for the film industry.

Unusually, none of the Best Actress nominees were also nominated in the same category at the 94th Academy Awards. Additionally, of the actresses nominated for the BAFA, only Lady Gaga had been nominated at the 28th Screen Actors Guild Awards. American film journalist Anne Thompson described Joanna Scanlan's nomination in the category as "bizarre"; Scanlan ultimately won and was surprised herself. In her speech, she thanked BAFTA in Welsh. NME and British film critic Peter Bradshaw wrote that she was a deserving winner. In winning the award for Best Actor in a Supporting Role, CODA actor Troy Kotsur became the first deaf actor to win a BAFA, as well as the first deaf actor to win a BAFTA in a major category and first deaf male actor to win a BAFTA. Bradshaw had worried that Belfast winning Outstanding British Film, and thus being labelled "British", could have been controversial, but was "very pleased" to see it was not significantly so, attributing this to the quality of the film.

Overall, Bradshaw felt that the winners were "well-judged and satisfying". Heritage also noted that the BAFA winners at the ceremony gave little fresh insight to the likely Oscar winners, with a mix of frontrunner and left-field wins.

Statistics

In Memoriam
The In Memoriam'' montage this year was played to the song "Send In the Clowns" by Stephen Sondheim, who was included within the montage.

The following appeared:

 Stephen Sondheim
 Sally Ann Howes
 Jane Powell
 Alan Ladd Jr.
 Lata Mangeshkar
 Roger Michell
 Jean-Paul Belmondo
 Dilip Kumar
 Halyna Hutchins
 Olympia Dukakis
 Monica Vitti
 Richard Donner
 Jean-Marc Vallée
 Ruthie Tompson
 Ivan Reitman
 Douglas Trumbull
 Leslie Bricusse OBE
 Mikis Theodorakis
 Jean-Jacques Beineix
 Lina Wertmüller
 Anthony Powell
 Walter Schneiderman
 Colin Young CBE
 Anthony Smith CBE
 Romaine Hart
 James Higgins
 Jon Gregory
 Richard Conway
 Peter Bogdanovich
 Menelik Shabazz
 Joan Washington
 Sally Kellerman
 Sir Sidney Poitier KBE

See also

 11th AACTA International Awards
 94th Academy Awards
 47th César Awards
 27th Critics' Choice Awards
 74th Directors Guild of America Awards
 35th European Film Awards
 79th Golden Globe Awards
 42nd Golden Raspberry Awards
 36th Goya Awards
 37th Independent Spirit Awards
 27th Lumières Awards
 11th Magritte Awards
 9th Platino Awards
 33rd Producers Guild of America Awards
 26th Satellite Awards
 47th Saturn Awards
 28th Screen Actors Guild Awards
 74th Writers Guild of America Awards

References

External links
 

2022 in London
2021 film awards
2022 in British cinema
Events at the Royal Albert Hall
2021 awards in the United Kingdom
2022 awards in the United Kingdom
Film075
March 2022 events in the United Kingdom